G.I. Bro may refer to:

Quel maledetto treno blindato, an Italian war film released as G.I. Bro in the United States
Al Phillips, retired professional wrestler
Booker Huffman, professional wrestler